The women's tournament of Beach volleyball at the 2013 Summer Universiade in Kazan was held between July 6–12.

Medalists

Preliminary round

Group A

|}

Group B

|}

Group C

|}

Group D

|}

Group E

|}

Group F

|}

Group G

|}

Group I

|}

Bracket

Winners Bracket

Top half

Bottom half

Losers Bracket

13th-24th place

7th-12th place

5th-6th place

Finals

References
Draw

2013 in beach volleyball
2013 Summer Universiade events
Beach volleyball at the Summer Universiade